The following is a list of notable deaths in September 2016.

Entries for each day are listed alphabetically by surname. A typical entry lists information in the following sequence:
Name, age, country of citizenship and reason for notability, established cause of death, reference.

September 2016

1
Raymond Daveluy, 89, Canadian composer, organist, music educator and arts administrator.
Thomas G. Doran, 80, American Roman Catholic prelate, Bishop of Rockford (1994–2012).
Frederick Drandua, 73, Ugandan Roman Catholic prelate, Bishop of Arua (1986–2009), diabetes. 
Fred Hellerman, 89, American folk singer (The Weavers), guitarist, producer and songwriter.
Kerson Huang, 88, Chinese-born American theoretical physicist.
Ruth Hubbard, 92, Austrian-born American biologist.
Kacey Jones, 66, American singer-songwriter ("I'm the One Mama Warned You About"), producer and humorist, cancer.
Len Maddocks, 90, Australian cricketer.
Leif Mæhle, 89, Norwegian literary historian.
Zahid Malik, 78, Pakistani journalist and editor.
William Ole Ntimama, 88, Kenyan politician, MP (2007–2014).
Jon Polito, 65, American actor (Miller's Crossing, The Rocketeer, Homicide: Life on the Street), multiple myeloma.
Emilio Prini, 73, Italian artist.
Frans ten Bos, 79, Scottish rugby union player (national team).

2
Nalinidhar Bhattacharya, 94, Indian poet and literary critic.
Neville Crowe, 79, Australian footballer.
*Gary D., 52, German trance producer and DJ, pulmonary embolism.
Blackie Gejeian, 90, American race car driver and hot rod builder.
Jerry Heller, 75, American music manager (N.W.A), heart attack.
John Hostetter, 69, American actor (Murphy Brown, G.I. Joe: A Real American Hero, Heartbreak Ridge), complications from cancer.
Islam Karimov, 78, Uzbek politician, President (since 1991), stroke.
Gerald Lehner, 48, Austrian football referee.
Don Minnick, 85, American baseball player (Washington Senators).
Margrit Mondavi, 91, Swiss-born American businesswoman, Vice President of Cultural Affairs at Robert Mondavi Winery.
David Morgan, 56, Northern Irish television presenter and journalist.
Antonina Seredina, 87, Soviet Russian sprint canoeist, Olympic champion (1960).
Joseph Whitney, 87, British-born Canadian geographer.
Daniel Willems, 60, Belgian Olympic cyclist (1976).
Chilla Wilson, 85, Australian rugby union player.
Eileen Younghusband, 95, British World War II officer and author.

3
Jack Aiken, 98, Australian politician.
Mir Quasem Ali, 63, Bangladeshi businessman, politician and war criminal, execution by hanging.
Maria Isabel Barreno, 77, Portuguese writer.
Kalthoum Bornaz, 71, Tunisian screenwriter, film editor and director.
Jane Brick, 74, Swedish journalist, brain tumor.
Carlos Bulgheroni, 71, Argentine businessman, CEO of Bridas.
Claudio Olinto de Carvalho, 74, Brazilian football player and coach (Cagliari).
Anna Dewdney, 50, American children's author and illustrator, brain cancer.
John W. Drummond, 96, American politician, member of the South Carolina Senate (1966–2008).
Albert Hofstede, 75, American politician, Mayor of Minneapolis (1974–1975, 1978–1979), respiratory illness.
Jaakko Kolmonen, 75, Finnish chef.
Pran Kurup, 49, Indian entrepreneur and author, heart failure. 
Norman Kwong, 86, Canadian football player (Calgary Stampeders, Edmonton Eskimos) and politician, Lieutenant Governor of Alberta (2005–2010).
Leslie H. Martinson, 101, American film and television director (Batman: The Movie, CHiPs, Fantasy Island).
Fred McFarlane, 55, American songwriter ("Show Me Love", "Don't Wanna Go Home"), record producer and musician.
Dabney Montgomery, 93, American pilot (Tuskegee Airmen), bodyguard of Martin Luther King Jr.
Jan Nilsen, 79, Norwegian footballer (Fredrikstad FK, national team).
Peter Oresick, 60, American poet, brain cancer.
Johnny Rebel, 77, American country singer. 
Vertamae Smart-Grosvenor, 79, American culinary anthropologist/griot, food writer and broadcaster on public media.
Jean-Christophe Yoccoz, 59, French mathematician.

4
Adam Bielański, 103, Polish chemist and professor.
Bob Bissonnette, 35, Venezuelan-born Canadian singer, ice hockey player (Hull Olympiques, Acadie–Bathurst Titan) and baseball team owner (Québec Capitales), helicopter crash.
Frank J. Barbaro, 88, American politician, member of the New York State Assembly (1973–1996), heart failure.
Gintautas Iešmantas, 86, Lithuanian politician.
Zvonko Ivezić, 67, Serbian footballer (Vojvodina, Sochaux, RC Paris).
Peter Janich, 74, German philosopher, cancer.
David Jenkins, 91, English cleric and theologian, Bishop of Durham (1984–1994).
Klaus Katzur, 73, German swimmer, Olympic silver medalist (1972).
Novella Matveyeva, 81, Russian poet and singer-songwriter.
Richard Neville, 74, Australian writer and editor (Oz).
Isidore Okpewho, 74, Nigerian novelist and critic.
Cyril C. Perera, 93, Sri Lankan author.
Clifford S. Perlman, 90, American businessman, CEO of Caesars Palace.
Melvyn Pignon, 86, English field hockey player. 
Clarence D. Rappleyea Jr., 82, American politician, member of the New York State Assembly (1973–1995).
Zoran Šami, 67, Serbian politician, speaker at the Parliament of Serbia and Montenegro.
Klaus Traube, 88, German mechanical engineer and anti-nuclear power activist.
Yang Jingnian, 107, Chinese economist.

5
John Ball, 81, English Anglican prelate, Assistant Bishop of Central Tanganyika.
Arif Beg, 81, Indian politician, Bharatiya Janta Party leader.
Gilbert Chapron, 83, French boxer, Olympic bronze medalist (1956).
She'ar Yashuv Cohen, 88, Israeli chief rabbi of Haifa.
Duane Graveline, 85, American astronaut.
Sir Fred Holliday, 80, British marine biologist. 
Jaroslav Jareš, 86, Czech football player and manager (Slavia Prague).
Joe Hosteen Kellwood, 95, American World War II veteran, Navajo code talker.
George McLeod, 83, Scottish footballer.
Max Murray, 80, Scottish footballer (Rangers, West Bromwich Albion).
Hugh O'Brian, 91, American actor (The Life and Legend of Wyatt Earp, The Shootist, Twins).
Rudolph T. Randa, 76, American judge, U.S. District Court Judge for the Eastern District of Wisconsin (since 1992), brain cancer.
Donald Ranvaud, 62, Italian-born British journalist and film producer (The Constant Gardener, Central Station, City of God), heart attack.
Phyllis Schlafly, 92, American constitutional lawyer, conservative activist and author, cancer.
Karl Schlechta, 94, Austrian football player and coach (Austria Wien, Sturm Graz, Rapid Wien).
Lindsay Tuckett, 97, South African Test cricketer.
Israfil Yilmaz, 29, Turkish-born Dutch ISIS trainer, militant and blogger, airstrike.

6
Richard Beeman, 74, American historian, amyotrophic lateral sclerosis.
Cary Blanchard, 47, American football player (Indianapolis Colts, New York Jets).
John Royston Coleman, 95, American university president (Haverford College), Parkinson's disease.
Emlyn Davies, 94, Welsh rugby union player (Swansea, Aberavon, national team).
H. Joel Deckard, 74, American politician, member of the United States House of Representatives from Indiana's 8th congressional district (1979–1983).
Raymond Hide, 87, British physicist.
Michael Ibru, 86, Nigerian businessman (Ibru Organization).
Edward J. Lofgren, 102, American physicist.
Nauyane Ariyadhamma Mahathera, 77, Sri Lankan Buddhist monk and author.
Lewis Merenstein, 81, American record producer (Van Morrison), pneumonia.
Dave Pacey, 79, English footballer (Luton Town).
Alfredo Peña, 72, Venezuelan journalist and politician.
Bernard Planque, 84, French Olympic basketball player
Darren Seals, 29, American activist (Black Lives Matter), shot.
Andrzej Szymczak, 67, Polish handball player, Olympic bronze medalist (1976).
Robert Timberg, 76, American journalist (The Baltimore Sun) and writer (The Nightingale's Song).
Lilian Uchtenhagen, 87, Swiss economist and politician.
Koos van Ellinckhuijzen, 74, Namibian artist.
Offlee Wild, 16, American Thoroughbred racehorse, heart attack.

7
António Barbosa de Melo, 83, Portuguese lawyer and politician.
José Barluenga, 76, Spanish chemist. 
D. J. Cameron, 83, New Zealand sports journalist.
Bobby Chacon, 64, American boxer, world champion (1974–1975, 1982–1983), fall.
Maria Costa, 89, Italian poet.
Clifford Curry, 79, American beach music and R&B singer ("She Shot a Hole in My Soul"). 
Bob Dailey, 63, Canadian ice hockey player (Vancouver Canucks, Philadelphia Flyers), cancer.
Ignacy Dybała, 90, Polish footballer 
Massimo Felisatti, 84, Italian author and screenwriter (Silent Action, The Night Evelyn Came Out of the Grave).
Ken Higgs, 79, English cricketer.
Peter Kavanagh, 63, Canadian radio producer, creator of Canada Reads, heart attack.
Joseph Keller, 93, American mathematician.
Shyamala Pappu, 82, Indian lawyer.
Norbert Schemansky, 92, American weightlifter, Olympic champion (1952).
Jean-Louis Schneiter, 83, French politician, Mayor of Reims (1999–2008).
Farhang Sharif, 84–85, Iranian musician and tar player.
Graham Wiggins, 53, American musician.
Kitty Xu Ting, 25, Chinese actress, lymphoma.
Ye Xiushan, 81, Chinese philosopher.
Vincent Zhu Wei-Fang, 90, Chinese Roman Catholic prelate, Bishop of Yongjia (since 2007).

8
Hannes Arch, 48, Austrian race pilot, world champion (2008), helicopter crash.
Johan Botha, 51, South African operatic tenor, cancer.
Inga Clendinnen, 82, Australian historian.
Jacques Dominati, 89, French politician.
Hazel Douglas, 92, British actress (Harry Potter and the Deathly Hallows – Part 1).
Sir Trevor Jones, 89, British politician. 
*The Lady Chablis, 59, American actress (Midnight in the Garden of Good and Evil), pneumonia.
Bert Llewellyn, 77, English footballer (Crewe, Port Vale, Wigan).
William J. McCormack, 83, Mauritian-born Canadian police chief (Toronto Police Service).
Antonio Nuzzi, 90, Italian Roman Catholic prelate, Archbishop of Sant'Angelo dei Lombardi-Conza-Nusco-Bisaccia (1981–1988) and Teramo-Atri (1988–2002).
Dragiša Pešić, 62, Montenegrin politician, Prime Minister of Yugoslavia (2001–2003).
Prince Buster, 78, Jamaican ska musician ("One Step Beyond", "Al Capone").
Roman Romanchuk, 37, Ukrainian-born Russian boxer and kickboxer, heart attack.
John Watts, 69, British politician, MP for Slough (1983–1997).
Greta Zimmer Friedman, 92, American dental assistant, subject in V-J Day in Times Square photo.

9
Chad Brown, 68, American football official (National Football League).
Sylvia Gore, 71, English football player (national team) and manager (Wales national team), cancer.
Luke Herrmann, 84, German-born British art historian.
James Blyden Jenkins-Johnston, 69, Sierra Leonean lawyer.
Koichi Kato, 77, Japanese politician, pneumonia.
Lord Littlebrook, 87, British midget wrestler, trainer and booking manager.
Zdeněk Měřínský, 68, Czech archeologist and historian.
Carl Miles, 98, American baseball player (Philadelphia Athletics).
Bill Nojay, 59, American politician, member of the New York State Assembly (since 2013), suicide by gunshot.
Ben Press, 92, American tennis player, prostate cancer.
James Siang'a, 67, Kenyan football player and manager (Gor Mahia, national team), diabetes.
Mario Spezi, 71, Italian journalist and author (The Monster of Florence: A True Story).
James Stacy, 79, American actor (Lancer, The Adventures of Ozzie and Harriet, Something Wicked This Way Comes), anaphylaxis.

10
Robert Eugene Allen, 81, American business executive, CEO of AT&T (1988–1997), stroke.
Horst Bergmann, 78, German Olympic wrestler.
Giuliano Carnimeo, 84, Italian director (The Case of the Bloody Iris).
Pyotr Devyatkin, 39, Kazakhstani Olympic ice hockey player (1998).
Luis Eduardo González, 70, Uruguayan political scientist, cancer.
Mahmut Hekimoğlu, 60, Turkish actor and film producer, prostate cancer.
Väinö Koskela, 95, Finnish Olympic long-distance runner (1948, 1952), European championship bronze medalist (1950).
Jutta Limbach, 82, German jurist and politician, President of the Federal Constitutional Court (1994–2002).
Frank Masley, 56, American Olympic luger (1980, 1984, 1988), cancer.
Jure Radić, 62, Croatian civil engineer and politician, gastric cancer.
Chris Stone, 81, American recording studio owner (Record Plant) and entrepreneur, heart attack and stroke.
Mojmír Stuchlík, 86, Czech Olympic ski jumper
Vladimír Vacátko, 63, German Olympic ice hockey player (1980).
Joy Viado, 57, Filipino comedian and actress, heart attack.
Joe Zaleski, 89, American-born Canadian football player and coach (Winnipeg Blue Bombers).

11
İshak Alaton, 89, Turkish businessman (Alarko Holding), heart failure.
Valeri Alikov, 56, Russian Hill Mari poet.
Alexis Arquette, 47, American actress (The Wedding Singer, Pulp Fiction, Lords of Dogtown), cardiac arrest.
Geert Bekaert, 88, Belgian architectural critic.
Michel Bergerac, 84, French executive (Revlon).
Per Brandtzæg, 80, Norwegian physician.
Lawrence D. Cohen, 83, American attorney, politician and judge, Mayor of St. Paul, Minnesota (1972–1976).
Louis E. Crandall, 87, American printer and entrepreneur (Legend City).
Beryl Crockford, 66, British rower, world champion (1985).
Nelson Davidyan, 66, Armenian Soviet wrestler, Olympic silver medalist (1976).
Ben Idrissa Dermé, 34, Burkinabe footballer (Sheriff Tiraspol, CA Bastia), heart attack.
Mbaye-Jacques Diop, 80, Senegalese politician, member of the National Assembly (1983–2004), Mayor of Rufisque (1987–2002).
Gavin Frost, 86, British Wiccan author.
Let's Elope, 28, New Zealand Thoroughbred racehorse, Melbourne Cup winner (1991).
Norman May, 88, Australian sports broadcaster.
Claude-Jean Philippe, 83, French film critic and filmmaker.
Bruno Poromaa, 80, Swedish politician, MP (1982–1994), municipal commissioner for Kiruna (1994–1998).
Dalmiro Sáenz, 90, Argentine playwright.
Ken Sparkes, 76, Australian radio broadcaster, heart attack.
Ricky Tosso, 56, Peruvian actor, cancer.
Lyn Wilde, 93, American singer and actress.

12
Gunnila Bernadotte, 93, Swedish countess.
Tor Brustad, 89, Norwegian biophysicist.
Ellen Burka, 95, Dutch-born Canadian figure skater and coach, Dutch national champion (1946, 1947).
Sándor Csoóri, 86, Hungarian poet, essayist, writer, and politician.
Edmund D. Edelman, 85, American politician.
Gerry Haywood, 70, English darts player.
Ali Javan, 89, Iranian-American physicist, heart attack.
Hidayat Inayat Khan, 99, English-French composer and conductor.
Peter Pettalia, 61, American politician, member of the Michigan House of Representatives (since 2011), traffic collision.
Tavin Pumarejo, 84, Puerto Rican actor, comedian and jíbaro singer.
Fred Quillan, 60, American football player (San Francisco 49ers), NFL champion (1981, 1984).
Arquimínio Rodrigues da Costa, 92, Portuguese Roman Catholic prelate, Bishop of Macau (1976–1988).
Hans Rosander, 79, Swedish footballer (IFK Norrköping, national team), complications from heart surgery.
William San Bento, 69, American politician, member of the Rhode Island House of Representatives (1993–2015).
Stanley Sheinbaum, 96, American peace and human rights activist.
Bob Wilkinson, 88, American football player (New York Giants), Parkinson's disease.

13
Denis Atkins, 77, English footballer (Bradford City).
Sunil Bardewa, 44, Nepalese pop singer.
Artyom Bezrodny, 37, Ukrainian-born Russian footballer (Spartak Moscow), heart attack.
Ottavio Bugatti, 87, Italian footballer (Napoli, Inter Milan).
Matt Gray, 80, Scottish footballer (Third Lanark, Manchester City).
Jack Hofsiss, 65, American stage director (The Elephant Man).
Judith Jacobs, 77, American legislator, fall.
Ermanno Rea, 89, Italian novelist, Viareggio Prize and Premio Campiello recipient.
Jonathan Riley-Smith, 78, English medieval historian.
Mike Roberts, 83, American radio sportscaster (New Mexico Lobos), cancer.
Gérard Rondeau, 63, French photographer, cancer.
Arnie Schmautz, 83, Canadian ice hockey player.
Unto Valpas, 72, Finnish politician, MP (1999–2011).

14
Valeriy Abramov, 60, Russian long-distance runner. 
Dick Adams, 96, American baseball player (Philadelphia Athletics).
Don Buchla, 79, American synthesizer designer.
Agostino Cossia, 79, Italian Olympic boxer.
Max Dunbier, 78, Australian politician, member of the New South Wales Legislative Assembly for Campbelltown (1968–1971).
Sir George Engle, 90, British barrister and civil servant.
Lady Caroline Faber, 93, British aristocrat.
Eduard Gusev, 80, Russian Soviet Olympic cyclist (1956).
Kim McGuire, 60, American actress (Cry-Baby), pneumonia.
Karl Gunnar Persson, 73, Swedish economic historian.
Dennis Shryack, 80, American screenwriter (Turner & Hooch, Pale Rider, Code of Silence), heart failure.
Hilmar Thate, 85, German actor (Veronika Voss).
Dean White, 93, American billionaire advertiser and hotel developer.
Richard Whittington-Egan, 91, British writer and criminologist.
Gareth F. Williams, 61, Welsh author, cancer.

15
Vera Cosgrave, 90, Irish public figure.
Haron Din, 76, Malaysian politician, spiritual leader of PAS (since 2014), heart illness.
John Gudenus, 75, Austrian politician and convicted Holocaust denier.
Deborah S. Jin, 47, American physicist, cancer.
Greg Maher, 49, Irish Gaelic football player (Mayo). 
Rose Mofford, 94, American politician, Governor of Arizona (1988–1991).
Domingos Montagner, 54, Brazilian actor (Velho Chico), drowning.
Robert H. Scott, 86, American lacrosse player and coach (Johns Hopkins Blue Jays).
Haakon Sørbye, 96, Norwegian engineer and resistance member.

16
Tarık Akan, 66, Turkish actor (Yol), cancer.
Edward Albee, 88, American playwright (Who's Afraid of Virginia Woolf?, A Delicate Balance, The Goat, or Who Is Sylvia?), Tony (1963, 2002) and Pulitzer Prize winner (1967, 1975, 1994).
Gabriele Amorth, 91, Italian Roman Catholic priest and exorcist, pulmonary disease.
Don Bass, 70, American professional wrestler (CWA), cancer.
Hagan Beggs, 79, Northern Irish-born Canadian actor (Danger Bay, Bordertown).
Bill Bossio, 88, American Olympic boxer.
Gilles Carpentier, 66, French author and editor.
Carlo Azeglio Ciampi, 95, Italian banker and politician, President (1999–2006) and Prime Minister (1993–1994), multiple organ failure.
Jerry Corbetta, 68, American musician (Sugarloaf), Pick's disease.
Teodoro González de León, 90, Mexican architect.
Reese Griffiths, 78, New Zealand rugby league player (West Coast, national team).
Dorothy Cann Hamilton, 67, American chef and businesswoman, CEO of the International Culinary Center, traffic collision.
Oļģerts Hehts, 84, Latvian basketball player.
Charles H. Henry, 79, American physicist.
Giancarlo Iliprandi, 91, Italian graphic designer.
P. Kannan, 77, Indian politician.
Todd Kimsey, 54, American actor (The Perfect Storm), lymphoma.
W. P. Kinsella, 81, Canadian writer (Shoeless Joe), euthanasia.
Norbert Kröcher, 66, German terrorist (2 June Movement), suicide by gunshot.
Gérard Louis-Dreyfus, 84, French-born American businessman (Louis Dreyfus Company).
Graeme MacKenzie, 81, Australian footballer, dementia.
António Mascarenhas Monteiro, 72, Cape Verdean politician, President (1991–2001).
John Bentley Mays, 75, Canadian journalist and novelist.
Marvin Mottet, 86, American Roman Catholic priest.
Gareth Powell, 82, Welsh writer. 
Qiao Renliang, 28, Chinese singer and actor, suicide.
Severino Santiapichi, 90, Italian magistrate and writer.
Jean-Paul Sauthier, 74, French Olympic field hockey player
Joe Seng, 69, American politician, member of the Iowa House of Representatives (2001–2003) and Senate (since 2003), brain cancer.
Hovhannes Tcholakian, 97, Turkish Armenian Catholic prelate, Archbishop of Istanbul (1967–2015).
Bojja Tharakam, 77, Indian writer and social activist, brain tumour.
Wang Mingfang, 63, Chinese politician, Chairman of CPPCC of Anhui Province (2011–2016).

17
Theodore Wilbur Anderson, 98, American mathematician and statistician, heart failure.
Clarence Brooks, 65, American football coach (Baltimore Ravens), esophageal and stomach cancer.
Charmian Carr, 73, American actress and singer (The Sound of Music), complications from dementia.
Desmond Clarke, 74, Irish philosopher.
C. Martin Croker, 54, American voice actor and animator (Space Ghost Coast to Coast, Aqua Teen Hunger Force, The Brak Show), sepsis.
Bahman Golbarnezhad, 48, Iranian Paralympic racing cyclist (2012, 2016), race collision.
Roman Ivanychuk, 87, Ukrainian writer.
Rune Larsson, 92, Swedish athlete, Olympic bronze medalist (1948).
Carmelo Morelos, 85, Filipino Roman Catholic prelate, Archbishop of Zamboanga (1994–2006).
Hans Mühlethaler, 86, Swiss writer.
Sigge Parling, 86, Swedish footballer (Djurgården), World Cup silver medalist (1958).
Bob Suter, 88,  Australian football player (Essendon).
Rose Warfman, 99, French Holocaust survivor and member of the French Resistance.

18
Stephanie Booth, 70, British hotelier, tractor collision. 
Joe Browder, 78, American environmental activist, cancer.
Robert W. Cone, 59, American Army general, prostate cancer.
John J. Craighead, 100, American wildlife scientist.
Camille Dagenais, 95, Canadian engineer.
Sir Nicholas Fenn, 80, British diplomat, High Commissioner to India (1991–1996).
Robert L. Genillard, 87, Swiss businessman.
Mary Grant, 88, Ghanaian politician.
David Kyle, 97, American science fiction writer.
Lee Ho-cheol, 84, South Korean writer.
Mandoza, 38, South African kwaito musician, pharyngeal cancer.
Tom Mintier, 68, American television journalist (CNN).
Remigio Molina, 45, Argentine Olympic boxer (1992).
Joan Patricia Murphy, 79, American politician, member of the Cook County Board of Commissioners (since 2002), breast cancer.
Oddvar Nes, 77, Norwegian linguist.
Rose Pak, 68, Chinese-born American political activist.
András Prékopa, 87, Hungarian mathematician.
Moïse Rahmani, 72, Belgian Sephardic author.
Hassan Sharif, 65, Emirati artist, cancer.
Tara Singh, 86, Indian sculptor.
Lamuel A. Stanislaus, 95, Grenadian dentist and diplomat.
Michel Vaxès, 75, French politician, member of the National Assembly for Bouches-du-Rhône (2007–2012).
Wolfhart Zimmermann, 88, German physicist.

19
Naser al-Raas, 33, Kuwaiti-born Canadian human rights activist, heart failure.
Burhanettin Bigalı, 89, Turkish general.
Karl Dietrich Bracher, 94, German political scientist and historian.
Bobby Breen, 88, Canadian-born American actor and singer.
Gerwald Claus-Brunner, 44, German politician, suicide.
Voula Damianakou, 102, Greek writer, translator. 
Mike Fellows, 59, American politician, traffic collision.
Bill Glassford, 102, American football player and coach.
Amin Yunis al Husseini, 86, Jordanian politician, Minister of Foreign Affairs and Social Welfare (1963–1965), Minister of Transport (1967–1970).
Jan O. Karlsson, 77, Swedish politician, Minister for Foreign Affairs (2003), Minister for International Development Cooperation, Migration and Asylum Policy (2002–2003).
Zerka T. Moreno, 99, Dutch-born American psychotherapist.
Annie Pootoogook, 47, Canadian Inuit artist, drowned.
Frank Raab, 95, American Naval officer and insurance executive.
Jorge Rubinetti, 71, Argentine chess master.
Fehmi Sağınoğlu, 78/79, Turkish footballer.
Allister Sparks, 83, South African writer, journalist and political commentator.
Frederick D. Tinsley, 76, American classical double bass player.
Boris Trakhtenbrot, 95, Russian-Israeli mathematician.
Amy van Singel, 66, American music journalist and radio host.
Bill Zucker, 60, American actor and comedian, heart attack.

20
Bill Barrett, 87, American politician, member of the United States House of Representatives from Nebraska's 3rd congressional district (1991–2001).
Bernard Bergonzi, 87, British literary scholar.
Betty Birch, 93, English cricketer.
Curt Brunnqvist, 91, Swedish Olympic rower.
Jean Chabbert, 95, French Roman Catholic prelate, Archbishop of Perpignan-Elne (1982–1996).
Alan Cousin, 78, Scottish footballer (Dundee, Hibernian, Falkirk).
Richie Dunn, 59, American ice hockey player (Buffalo Sabres, Calgary Flames, Hartford Whalers).
Garry Edmundson, 84, Canadian ice hockey player (Toronto Maple Leafs).
Jack Garman, 72, American computer engineer and NASA official, key figure in the Apollo 11 mission, bone marrow cancer.
Paule Gauthier, 72, Canadian lawyer.
Peter Leo Gerety, 104, American Roman Catholic prelate, Bishop of Portland (1969–1974) and Archbishop of Newark (1974–1986), world's oldest living Catholic bishop.
Erwin Hahn, 95, American physicist.
Curtis Hanson, 71, American film director and screenwriter (L.A. Confidential, 8 Mile, Wonder Boys), Oscar winner (1998).
Dennis M. Jones, 78, American businessman (Jones Pharma).
Terry Kohler, 82, American businessman, CEO of Vollrath (since 1982).
Clive Kolbe, 72, South African cricketer.
Yuri Korablin, 56, Russian politician and businessman, owner of Venezia F.C.
Agniva Lahiri, 37, Indian LGBT activist, liver failure.
Micki Marlo, 88, American singer and model.
David McCay, 72, South African cricketer.
Foil A. Miller, 100, American chemist and philatelist.
Geno Morosi, 96, American World War II veteran.
Edmund F. O'Connor, 94, American air force officer.
Victor Scheinman, 73, American inventor.
R. Heiner Schirmer, 74, German biochemist.
Jim Semple, 81, Northern Irish businessman.

21
Mahmadu Alphajor Bah, 40, Sierra Leonean footballer (Lokeren, Chunnam, Xiamen and national team), traffic collision.
Régis Barailla, 83, French politician, member of National Assembly (1983–1993).
Rosemary Barrow, 48, Welsh art historian.
Leonidas Donskis, 54, Lithuanian philosopher and politician. 
Giuseppe Drago, 60, Italian politician, President of Sicily (1998), lung infection.
Ragnar Hvidsten, 89, Norwegian footballer (Sandefjord, Skeid, national team).
Shawty Lo, 40, American hip-hop musician (D4L), traffic collision.
John D. Loudermilk, 82, American singer and songwriter ("Tobacco Road", "Then You Can Tell Me Goodbye", "Indian Reservation"), bone cancer.
John Mulvaney, 90, Australian archaeologist.
George T. Odom, 66, American actor (Straight Out of Brooklyn, The Hurricane, Law & Order).
Kalervo Rauhala, 85, Finnish wrestler, Olympic silver medalist (1952).
Jack Rawlings, 93, English footballer (Hayes, Hendon).
Earl Smith Jr., 51, American acid house musician (Phuture), complications from stroke.
Richard D. Trentlage, 87, American advertising executive and jingle writer (Oscar Meyer, V8, National Safety Council), heart failure.

22
Kjell Albin Abrahamson, 71, Swedish journalist (Sveriges Radio), stroke. 
Walter Bush, 86, American Hall of Fame ice hockey administrator (USA Hockey).
Georges Fonghoro, 58, Malian Roman Catholic prelate, Bishop of Mopti (since 1999).
Leonard I. Garth, 95, American federal judge, U.S. Court of Appeals for the Third Circuit (1973–1986), U.S. District Court for the District of New Jersey (1969–1973).
Joseph Harmatz, 91, Lithuanian World War II Jewish partisan fighter and anti-Nazi avenger.
Svein Gunnar Morgenlien, 94, Norwegian trade unionist and politician, MP (1975–1981).
George Hanson, 81, American basketball coach (Minnesota Golden Gophers)
Gian Luigi Rondi, 94, Italian screenwriter and film director.
John Siddons, 88, Australian politician, Senator (1981–1983, 1985–1987).
Ed Temple, 89, American track and field coach (Tennessee State Lady Tigers, women's Olympic team).

23
Marcel Artelesa, 78, French footballer (Monaco, Marseille).
Yngve Brodd, 86, Swedish footballer (Toulouse, Sochaux-Montbéliard, IFK Göteborg).
David Coleman, 74, English footballer (Colchester United), cancer.
Peter Collingwood, 96, British-born Australian actor (Picnic at Hanging Rock).
Frances Dafoe, 86, Canadian pair skater, Olympic silver medalist (1956), world champion (1954, 1955).
Nan Fry, 71, American poet. 
Arnold Green, 83, New Zealand rugby league player (West Coast, national team).
Carolyn Hardy, 86, British horticulturalist.
Larry Harmon, 75, American soccer coach.
Bill Johnson, 92, New Zealand actor.
Stephen Lawn, 50, British medical researcher, glioblastoma.
Rudi Lüttge, 93, German Olympic racewalker (1952).
Jeff Mackintosh, 45, Canadian graphic artist and game designer (Sailor Moon, Silver Age Sentinels), glioblastoma multiforme.
Max Mannheimer, 96, Czech-born German painter, author and Holocaust survivor.
Herman Joseph Sahadat Pandoyoputro, 77, Indonesian Roman Catholic prelate, Bishop of Malang (1989–2016).
Michel Rousseau, 80, French cyclist, Olympic champion (1956).
Andrzej Tarkowski, 83, Polish embryologist.

24
Christoph Albrecht, 86, German organist and conductor. 
Donald Cartridge, 81, English cricketer (Hampshire).
Mel Charles, 81, Welsh footballer (Swansea, Arsenal, national team).
James Crowden, 88, British Olympic rower (1952).
Andy Gambucci, 87, American ice hockey player, Olympic silver medallist (1952).
Michael Kulich, 29, American adult entertainment executive.
Vladimir Kuzmichyov, 37, Russian footballer, traffic collision.
Wenche Lowzow, 90, Norwegian LGBT activist and politician, MP (1977–1985).
Arne Melchior, 91, Danish politician, MP (1973–1975, 1977–2001), Transport Minister (1982–86).
Klaus Moje, 79, German-Australian artist.
Bill Mollison, 88, Australian researcher, author, teacher and biologist.
Jack Nadel, 92, American entrepreneur and author.
Bill Nunn, 63, American actor (Do the Right Thing, Spider-Man, Sister Act), leukemia.
Matti Pulli, 83, Finnish ski jumping coach, Parkinson's disease.
Jacek Andrzej Rossakiewicz, 59, Polish painter.
Buckwheat Zydeco, 68, American accordionist and bandleader, lung cancer.

25
Rudy Andabaker, 88, American football player (Pittsburgh Steelers). 
Jean Boissonnat, 87, French journalist.
David Budbill, 76, American poet and playwright, Parkinson's disease.
Henning Enoksen, 80, Danish footballer, Olympic silver medalist (1960).
José Fernández, 24, Cuban-born American baseball player (Miami Marlins), boat collision.
Dawn Hampton, 88, American cabaret and jazz singer, saxophonist, dancer and songwriter (Malcolm X).
Nahed Hattar, 56, Jordanian writer, shot.
Peter Henderson, 87, Australian public servant.
Hughie Jones, 89, British Anglican priest, Archdeacon of Loughborough (1986–1992).
Kashif, 59, American musician (B.T. Express) and record producer.
Hans Korte, 87, German actor (Spider's Web).
Hagen Liebing, 55, German musician (Die Ärzte), brain tumour.
K. Madhavan, 101, Indian politician.
René Marsiglia, 57, French football player and manager (Lille, Nice).
Victor Munden, 88, English cricketer (Leicestershire).
David Padilla, 89, Bolivian politician, President (1978–1979).
Arnold Palmer, 87, American Hall of Fame professional golfer.
Jean Shepard, 82, American honky tonk singer-songwriter ("A Dear John Letter", "Slippin' Away"), Parkinson's disease.
Sir Patrick Sissons, 71, British physician.
Joseph Sitruk, 71, Tunisian-born French rabbi.
Rod Temperton, 66, British songwriter ("Boogie Nights", "Always and Forever", "Thriller") and musician, cancer.
Robert Weinberg, 70, American science fiction author.
Anthony Xu Ji-wei, 81, Chinese clandestine Roman Catholic prelate, Bishop of Taizhou (since 2010).

26
Taz Anderson, 77, American football player (St. Louis Cardinals, Atlanta Falcons).
Richard Bishop, 66, American football player (New England Patriots).
Don Brothwell, 83, British archaeologist.
Giambattista Capretti, 70, Italian Olympic boxer (1968, 1972).
Joe Clay, 78, American rockabilly musician.
Jack Cotton, 91, American basketball player (Denver Nuggets).
Mark Dvoretsky, 68, Russian chess player and trainer.
Giacomo Fornoni, 76, Italian racing cyclist, Olympic gold medalist (1960).
Hans Hoffmeister, 80, German Olympic water polo player.
Etim Inyang, 84, Nigerian policeman.
Jack Kirrane, 88, American ice hockey player, Olympic gold medalist (1960).
Lee Kwang-jong, 52, South Korean football player and coach, leukemia.
Herschell Gordon Lewis, 90, American film director (Blood Feast, Two Thousand Maniacs!).
Jens Lothe, 84, Norwegian physicist.
Wilhelm Mohr, 99, Norwegian aviation officer.
Ioan Gyuri Pascu, 55, Romanian singer, producer, actor and comedian, heart attack.
Curtis Roosevelt, 86, American writer, heart attack.
Jan van Ruiten, 85, Dutch politician, member of the House of Representatives (2002–2003).
Karel Růžička, 76, Czech jazz pianist, Anděl Award winner (1993).
Jackie Sewell, 89, English footballer (Notts County, Sheffield Wednesday, Aston Villa).
Toughie, Panamanian frog, last surviving of the Rabbs fringe-limbed treefrog.

27
Jamshid Amouzegar, 93, Iranian politician, Prime Minister (1977–1978), Minister of Finance (1965–1974).
Jef Billings, 71, American costume designer.
Jonathan David Brown, 60, American record producer and audio engineer.
Jacob Buksti, 69, Danish politician, Minister of Transport (2000–2001).
Randy Duncan, 79, American gridiron football player and lawyer.
Syed Shamsul Haque, 81, Bangladeshi poet and writer.
Ronald King Murray, Lord Murray, 94, Scottish politician and jurist, Lord Advocate (1974–1979).
Paddy O'Flaherty, 73, Northern Irish broadcaster.
Luis Ossio, 86, Bolivian politician, Vice President (1989–1993).
Sebastian Papaiani, 80, Romanian film and television actor.
Jean-Louis Ravelomanantsoa, 73, Malagasy Olympic athlete (1964, 1968, 1972).
Charles Schultze, 91, American economist and public policy analyst, complications from sepsis.
Hannan Shah, 74, Bangladeshi politician and army officer.
Serigne Abdou Thiam, 21, Qatari footballer (Al-Khor), cancer.
Haruko Wakita, 82, Japanese historian.
Rod Woodward, 72, Canadian football player (Ottawa Rough Riders).

28
Chamsulvara Chamsulvarayev, 32, Russian-born Azeri Olympic freestyle wrestler (2008) and ISIS terrorist, air strike.
Joseph V. Charyk, 96, Canadian-born American engineer, Under Secretary of the Air Force (1960–1963).  
Seamus Dunne, 86, Irish footballer (Luton Town, national team).
Ann Emery, 86, British actress (Billy Elliot, Julia Jekyll and Harriet Hyde).
Johan Fischerström, 72, Swedish Olympic handball player.
Werner Friese, 70, German footballer (GDR national team).
Gary Glasberg, 50, American television producer and writer (NCIS, Crossing Jordan, Bones).
John F. Good, 80, American FBI agent who created the Abscam sting operation.
Graham Hawkins, 70, English football player (Wolverhampton Wanderers, Blackburn Rovers) and manager.
Michael Javaid, 65, Pakistani politician, heart attack.
Malcolm Lucas, 89, American judge, Chief Justice of the California Supreme Court (1987–1996), U.S. District Court Judge for the Central District of California (1971–1984).
Larkin Malloy, 62, American actor (The Edge of Night, Guiding Light, All My Children) and announcer, complications from a heart attack.
Sreten Mirković, 58, Serbian boxer, lung cancer. 
Gloria Naylor, 66, American novelist (The Women of Brewster Place), heart attack.
Agnes Nixon, 93, American television writer and producer (One Life to Live, All My Children, Guiding Light).
Shimon Peres, 93, Polish-born Israeli statesman, President (2007–2014), Prime Minister (1977, 1984–1986, 1995–1996), Nobel Laureate (1994), stroke.
Timothy Pesci, 72, American politician, member of the Pennsylvania House of Representatives (1989-2000).
Max Walker, 68, Australian Test cricketer and football player, myeloma.

29
Raúl Águila, 86, Chilean footballer.
Terence Brady, 77, British writer (Upstairs, Downstairs) and actor.
Cheng Yu-tung, 91, Hong Kong businessman (Chow Tai Fook).
Nora Dean, 72, Jamaican singer.
Miriam Defensor Santiago, 71, Filipino politician and judge, Senator (1995–2001, 2004–2016), International Criminal Court Judge (2012–2014), lung cancer.
Gilles Dubé, 89, Canadian ice hockey player (Detroit Red Wings, Montreal Canadiens).
Hidden Lake, 23, American thoroughbred racehorse, euthanized.
Shirley Jaffe, 93, American painter and sculptor.
Jim Kilroy, 94, American sport-sailor and maxi yacht racer.
Joni Madraiwiwi, 59, Fijian lawyer and politician, Vice President of Fiji (2004–2006), Chief Justice of the Supreme Court of Nauru (since 2014).
Herbert Martin, 91, German footballer (1. FC Saarbrücken, Saarland national team).
Sandra Morgen, 66, American feminist anthropologist.
Ashok Pai, 69, Indian psychiatrist and film producer, cardiac arrest.
Isabel Piczek, 88, Hungarian ecclesiastical artist.
Joseph Verner Reed Jr., 78, American banker and diplomat.
Mark Ricks, 92, American politician, Lieutenant Governor of Idaho (2006–2007) and State Senator (1979–1994).
Anthony Ryle, 89, English medical doctor.
Otto ter Haar, 73, Dutch Olympian
Laura Troschel, 71, Italian actress (Four Flies on Grey Velvet), singer, and model.
Ralph V. Whitworth, 60, American businessman, cancer.
Brahim Zniber, 96, Moroccan businessman and vintner.

30
George Barris, 94, American photographer (Marilyn Monroe).
Ted Benoit, 69, French comics artist and graphic novelist.
Gordon Borrie, Baron Borrie, 85, English lawyer and life peer.
Charles Brading, 81, American politician, member of the Ohio House of Representatives (1993–2000).
Oscar Brand, 96, Canadian-born American folk singer-songwriter, author and radio broadcaster (WNYC).
Michael Casswell, 53, English guitarist, drowned.
Herawati Diah, 99, Indonesian journalist.
Paul Frantz, 89, French football player and manager (Strasbourg).
Frederic C. Hamilton, 89, American oilman and arts philanthropist.
Hanoi Hannah, 85, Vietnamese radio personality.
Arthur Harnden, 92, American sprinter, Olympic gold medalist (1948).
Bjarni Jónsson, 96, Icelandic mathematician.
Lilleba Lund Kvandal, 76, Norwegian opera singer.
Mike Towell, 25, Scottish professional boxer, injuries sustained in a bout.
Jim Zapp, 92, American baseball player (Baltimore Elite Giants).

References

2016-09
 09